The 1996 ICF World Junior Canoe Slalom Championships were the 6th edition of the ICF World Junior Canoe Slalom Championships. The event took place in Lipno nad Vltavou, Czech Republic from 11 to 14 July 1996 under the auspices of the International Canoe Federation (ICF).

A total of eight medal events took place.

Medal summary

Men

Canoe

Kayak

Women

Kayak

Medal table

References

External links
International Canoe Federation

ICF World Junior Canoe Slalom Championships
ICF World Junior and U23 Canoe Slalom Championships